Sumer Is Icumen In: The Pagan Sound of British and Irish Folk 1966–75 is a 2020 compilation album released by Grapefruit Records, an imprint label of Cherry Red Records. It consists of British folk revival music influenced by the counterculture of the 1960s; the song material has a focus on eerie and mystical elements.

Background
In 2015, Grapefruit Records, an imprint label of Cherry Red Records, released the 3-CD compilation album Dust on the Nettles: A Journey Through the British Underground Folk Scene 1967–72. It had a focus on the meeting between the British folk revival and the counterculture of the 1960s. It was followed by Sumer Is Icumen In: The Pagan Sound of British and Irish Folk 1966–75, which differs from its predecessor by having a stronger focus on spiritual and eerie elements.

Reception
Grapefruit Records released Sumer Is Icumen In on 27 November 2020. Multiple critics wrote that the album contains tracks from both famous and obscure acts. AllMusics Timothy Monger said the mystical elements are best represented by less famous acts such as Oberon, Meic Stevens and Jan Dukes de Grey. Aspects of progressive folk, according to Monger, are best represented by Comus, Dr. Strangely Strange and Third Ear Band, and more traditional approaches by Archie Fisher and Anne Briggs. Monger named Briggs' previously unreleased "Summer's In" as a standout track, gave the album a rating of four and a half out of five and he called the material "quite magical and still captivating a half-century later". David Honigmann of the Financial Times wrote that the music on Sumer Is Icumen In is rooted in the eerie and uncanny aspects of traditional song material which makes it distinct from New Age culture. He rated the album four out of five and called it "a wintry collection, melodic and strangely strange".

Several critics mentioned the 1973 film The Wicker Man as a cultural reference point; track number two, "Corn Rigs" performed by Magnet, comes from that film. For The Arts Desk, Kieron Tyler wrote that Sumer Is Icumen In has a "pick-'n-mix approach to the pagan", comparing it to The Wicker Man in that regard, in which atmosphere is at the centre. He highlighted the tracks from Fairport Convention, The Incredible String Band, Comus and Amber, and although he described some tracks as weak, he wrote that the album is "stuffed with gems". Jack Hopkin of It's Psychedelic Baby! Magazine wrote that Sumer Is Icumen In is more coherent than Dust on the Nettless and thought it was an improvement to include Irish acts such as Dr. Strangely Strange. He said the selection can be enjoyed by "both the casual fan and serious archivist" and the album should appeal to fans of freak-folk.

Track listing

See also
 Sumer is icumen in

References

External links
 Official website

2020 compilation albums
Cherry Red Records compilation albums
Folk rock compilation albums
Psychedelic folk albums